De Grote Sinterklaasfilm: Trammelant in Spanje is a 2021 Dutch film directed by Lucio Messercola. The film won the Golden Film award after having sold 100,000 tickets. The film finished in 19th place in the list of best visited films in the Netherlands in 2021 with just over 210,000 visitors.

Robert ten Brink plays the role of Sinterklaas. The film also features television personality Martien Meiland and investigative journalist Peter R. de Vries.

Part of the film was filmed in De Rijp, Netherlands.

See also 
 De Grote Sinterklaasfilm
 De Grote Sinterklaasfilm: Gespuis in de Speelgoedkluis

References

External links 
 

2021 films
2020s Dutch-language films
Dutch children's films
Sinterklaas films
Films directed by Lucio Messercola
Films shot in the Netherlands